Al Green's Greatest Hits, Volume II is the second Al Green best of compilation album, released in 1977. It peaked at number 134 on the Billboard 200.

Track listing 

 "Love and Happiness" – 5:00
 "Sha La La (Make Me Happy)" – 2:56
 "Take Me to the River" – 3:43
 "L-O-V-E (Love)" – 3:03
 "Rhymes" – 3:33
 "For the Good Times" – 6:27
 "Keep Me Cryin'" – 3:06
 "Livin' for You" – 3:09
 "Full of Fire" – 5:12

References 

Al Green albums
1977 greatest hits albums
albums produced by Willie Mitchell (musician)
Hi Records compilation albums